The 19th Online Film Critics Society Awards, honoring the best in film for 2015, were announced on December 7, 2015. The winners were announced on December 14, 2015.

Nominees

References 

2015 film awards
2015